The Diocese of Iran is one of the four dioceses of the Anglican Province of Jerusalem and the Middle East. The diocese was established in 1912 as the Diocese of Persia and was incorporated into the Jerusalem Archbishopric in 1957. The most recent bishop was Azad Marshall, until 2016. His title is Bishop in Iran, rather than the often expected Bishop of Iran.

History

The Revd. Henry Martyn visited Persia in 1811. He reached Shiraz, then he travelled to Tabriz to attempt to present the Shah with his Persian translation of the New Testament. The British ambassador to the Shah, was unable to bring about a meeting, but did deliver the manuscript to the Shah. The Church Missionary Society (CMS) was active in Persia from 1869, when the Revdd Robert Bruce established a mission station at Julfa in Ispahan. The CMS mission in Persia expanded to include Kerman, Yezd (1893) and Shiraz (1900), with Mary Bird, a medical missionary, establishing hospitals at Kerman and Yezd. The CMS mission operated hospitals and schools. After Bishop Edward Stuart resigned as the Bishop of Waiapu in New Zealand, he then served as a CMS missionary in Julfa from 1894 to 1911.

The beginnings of the Anglican Diocese of Iran were in 1883 when Valpy French, an Episcopal bishop, came to Lahore and traveled through Persia. In 1912, Charles Stileman became the first bishop of the new diocese. James Linton was consecrated as the next bishop in 1919. On 18 October 1935, William Thompson was consecrated as Iran's third bishop in St Paul's Cathedral, London. On 25 April 1961, he was succeeded by Hassan Dehqani-Tafti, the first native Persian bishop of Iran. On 11 June 1986, Iraj Mottahedeh was consecrated as the fifth bishop of Iran.

When Iraj Mottahedeh retired in 2004, the Central Synod of the Episcopal Church in Jerusalem and the Middle East invited Azad Marshall, a bishop of the Church of Pakistan and an associate bishop in the Diocese of Cyprus and the Gulf, to provide episcopal oversight to the Diocese of Iran as its bishop. He was installed on 5 August 2007 in St Paul's Church in Tehran by Mouneer Anis, Bishop of Egypt and Presiding Bishop of the ECJME.

Bishops of the Diocese of Persia/Iran

1912–1917: Charles Stileman
1917–1935: James Linton
1935–1960: William Thompson
1960–1990: Hassan Dehqani-Tafti
1985–1990: Iraj Mottahedeh, Assistant Bishop
1985–2002: Iraj Mottahedeh (interim bishop 2002–2004)
2007–2016: Azad Marshall (became Bishop in Raiwind)
2016–present: vacant
2017–2019: Albert Walters, Vicar-General

See also

 Christianity in Iran
 Episcopal Church in Jerusalem and the Middle East
 Church Missionary Society in the Middle East and North Africa

References

External links
 Anglican Diocese of Iran

Anglicanism in Iran
Christian organizations established in 1912
Iran
Anglican dioceses established in the 20th century
Iran
1912 establishments in Iran